Brooke Smith may refer to:

 Brooke Smith (actress) (born 1967), American actress
 Brooke Smith (basketball) (born 1984), American basketball player
 Brooke Smith, Houston, a historic neighborhood in Houston, Texas
 Mackenzie Brooke Smith (born 2001), American actress

See also
 Brooke Howard-Smith (born 1972), New Zealand broadcaster

Smith, Brooke